Jean Milhau (born 18 December 1929 in Castelfranc, Lot) was a member of the Senate of France, representing the Lot Département.  He is a member of the Radical Party of the Left (PRG).

Biography 
A retired pharmacist, Milhau became a member of the Senate of France for the Lot Département on 25 September 2008, after the death of André Boyer, for whom he was deputy.

Current positions 
 Senator for Lot
 Town councillor in Cazals, Lot
 President of SYMICTOM for Gourdon, Lot

Previous positions
 1994–2004 : President of the General Council of Lot
 1982–1994 : Vice. President of the General Council of Lot
 1973–2004 : General Council of Lot for the canton of Cazals
 1965–1995 : Mayor of Cazals
 1959–1965 : Deputy mayor of Cazals.

Awards
 Knight of the Ordre national du Mérite, 1979
 Knight of the Légion d'honneur, 1988
 Officer of the Légion d'honneur, 1997.

Notes and references

See also 
 Cazals, Lot

External links 
  Milhau's page on the Senate website

1929 births
Living people
People from Lot (department)
Politicians from Occitania (administrative region)
Radical Party of the Left politicians
French Senators of the Fifth Republic
Knights of the Ordre national du Mérite
Senators of Lot (department)